Eupithecia atrisignis is a moth in the  family Geometridae. It is found from the western Himalayas to south-western China.

References

Moths described in 1889
atrisignis
Moths of Asia